The Men's 100 metre freestyle competition at the 2022 World Aquatics Championships was held on 21 and 22 June 2022.

Records
Prior to the competition, the existing world and championship records were as follows.

Results

Heats
The heats were started on 21 June at 09:09.

Semifinals
The semifinals were started on 21 June at 18:26.

Swim-off
The swim-off was held on 21 June at 20:20.

Final
The final was held on 22 June at 18:22.

References

Men's 100 metre freestyle